The second season of the American television sitcom 2 Broke Girls, premiered on CBS on September 24, 2012, and concluded on May 13, 2013. The series was created and executively produced by Michael Patrick King and Whitney Cummings. The season focuses on Max Black, a sarcastic below-the-poverty-line waitress, and Caroline Channing, a disgraced New York socialite turned waitress, as they continue their cupcake business venture, opening a store for Max's Homemade Cupcakes.

Kat Dennings and Beth Behrs portray the two lead characters of the series, Max Black and Caroline Channing. The main cast is rounded out by actors Garrett Morris, Jonathan Kite, Matthew Moy and Jennifer Coolidge, who portray Earl, Oleg, Han Lee, and Sophie Kaczynski, respectively.

2 Broke Girls' first season aired during the 2012–13 television season on Mondays at 9:00 p.m. EST. The season premiere debuted to 10.14 million viewers, almost half the audience of last season's premiere. The season averaged 10.63 million viewers.


Plot
Early in the second season, Sophie lends the two women $20,000, which is enough for them to start their business. However, the business fails, and in the 18th episode, they are forced to give up the lease of their cupcake shop with just enough money to pay off Sophie's loan, resetting the end of episode tally to $1. The shop opposite to theirs belonged to Andrew who had his own candy shop named Candy Andy's Sweets and Treats. Andy (Ryan Hansen) was Caroline's first major love interest, but they broke up because Caroline's main focus was the cupcake business and Andy "wanted more".

Cast and characters
 Kat Dennings as Max Black
 Beth Behrs as Caroline Channing
 Jonathan Kite as Oleg
 Garrett Morris as Earl
 Matthew Moy as Han
 Jennifer Coolidge as Sophie Kaczynski

Production

The first season employed a cast a six main actors. Actresses Kat Dennings and Beth Behrs return to portray their respective roles as Max Black, a sarcastic below-the-poverty-line waitress, and Caroline Channing, a former socialite who is bankrupt following her father's arrest for his involvement in a Ponzi scheme. Jonathan Kite, Garrett Morris and Matthew Moy also return as Oleg, a foreign hypersexed cook; Earl, a wise but hip elderly cashier; and Han, the Korean proprietor of the diner. Jennifer Coolidge joins the main cast for the second season, portraying Sophie Kaczynski, a Polish cleaning businesswoman who moves into the building where Max and Caroline live, beginning in the episode "And the Upstairs Neighbor". Nick Zano returns as a guest to portray Johnny, a street artist and Max's potential love interest.

Episodes

Ratings

References

2012 American television seasons
2013 American television seasons